The 2022 Arizona State Sun Devils football team represents Arizona State University as a member of as a member of the Pac-12 Conference during the 2022 NCAA Division I FBS football season. After starting the season with 1–2, head coach Herm Edwards was fired on September 18. Shaun Aguano took over as interim head coach. The Sun Devils play their home games at Sun Devil Stadium in Tempe Arizona. The Sun Devils went 3-9, their worst season since 1946.  This season is also the worst attended season since 1968, averaging 43,081 for the six home games.

Previous season

The Sun Devils finished the 2021 season with an 8–5 record, and a 6–3 conference record. They finished in a tie for second place with UCLA in the South Division.

Offseason

2022 NFL draft

ASU players drafted into the NFL

Undrafted NFL free agents

Recruiting class 
The Sun Devils signed a total of 6 student–athletes on Early National Signing Day (December, 2021).

Recruits

Position key

Transfers

Outgoing 

The Sun Devils lost 17 players via transfer portal prior to the 2022 season.

Incoming

Preseason

Pac-12 Media Day
The Pac-12 Media Day was held in July, 2022 in Hollywood, California.

Preseason All-Pac-12 teams

First Team

Second Team

Personnel

Roster

Coaching staff 

Graduate assistants 

Analysts 

Support Staff

Schedule

Game summaries

vs. Northern Arizona

at No. 11 Oklahoma State

vs. Eastern Michigan

vs. No. 13 Utah

at No. 6 USC

vs. No. 21 Washington

at Stanford

at Colorado

vs. No. 12 UCLA

at Washington State

vs. No. 23 Oregon State

at Arizona

Rankings

References

Arizona State
Arizona State Sun Devils football seasons
Arizona State Sun Devils football